In digital signal processing (DSP), a normalized frequency is a ratio of a variable frequency and a constant frequency associated with a system (such as a sampling rate).  Some software applications require normalized inputs and produce normalized outputs, which can be re-scaled to physical units when necessary.  Mathematical derivations are usually done in normalized units, relevant to a wide range of applications.

Examples of normalization 
A typical choice of characteristic frequency is the sampling rate that is used to create the digital signal from a continuous one.  The normalized quantity, has the unit cycle per sample regardless of whether the original signal is a function of time or distance.  For example, when  is expressed in Hz (cycles per second),  is expressed in samples per second.

Some programs (such as MATLAB toolboxes) that design filters with real-valued coefficients prefer the Nyquist frequency as the frequency reference, which changes the numeric range that represents frequencies of interest from   cycle/sample to  half-cycle/sample.  Therefore, the normalized frequency unit is obviously important when converting normalized results into physical units.

The following table shows examples of normalized frequency for  = 1 kHz,   = 44100 samples/second (often denoted by 44.1 kHz), and 4 normalization conventions:

See also
Prototype filter

References

Digital signal processing
Frequency